Hilda Bettermann (October 22, 1942 – January 28, 2023) was an American politician who served in the Minnesota House of Representatives from 1991 to 1999.

Bettermann died on January 23, 2023, at the age of 80. She was living in Diamond Willow assistant living and memory care in Alexandria, Minnesota, at her time of death.

References

1942 births
2023 deaths
21st-century American women
People from Douglas County, Minnesota
Republican Party members of the Minnesota House of Representatives
Women state legislators in Minnesota
20th-century American politicians
20th-century American women politicians